"Not even wrong" is a phrase often used to describe pseudoscience or bad science. It describes an argument or explanation that purports to be scientific but uses faulty reasoning or speculative premises, which can be neither affirmed nor denied and thus cannot be discussed rigorously and scientifically. 

For a meaningful discussion on whether a certain statement is true or false, the statement must satisfy the criterion of falsifiability, the inherent possibility for the statement to be tested and found false. In this sense, the phrase "not even wrong" is synonymous with "unfalsifiable".

History of the expression 
The phrase is generally attributed to the theoretical physicist Wolfgang Pauli, who was known for his colorful objections to incorrect or careless thinking. Rudolf Peierls documents an instance in which "a friend showed Pauli the paper of a young physicist which he suspected was not of great value but on which he wanted Pauli's views. Pauli remarked sadly, 'It is not even wrong'." This is also often quoted as "That is not only not right; it is not even wrong", or in Pauli's native German, "" Peierls remarks that quite a few apocryphal stories of this kind have been circulated and mentions that he listed only the ones personally vouched for by him. He also quotes another example when Pauli replied to Lev Landau, "What you said was so confused that one could not tell whether it was nonsense or not."

Columbia physicist Peter Woit used the phrase in the title of his book Not Even Wrong: The Failure of String Theory and the Search For Unity in Physical Law. Woit also writes a blog of that name.

See also

References

External links 
 

English phrases
Philosophy of science
Scientific terminology
Pejorative terms